Shah Hadiizzzaman is a Bangladesh Awami League politician and the former Member of Parliament of Jessore-4.

Career
Hadiizzzaman was elected to parliament from Jessore-4 as a Bangladesh Awami League candidate in 1986.

Death
Hadiizzzzman died on 20 February 2017 in Square Hospital, Dhaka, Bangladesh.

References

Awami League politicians
2017 deaths
3rd Jatiya Sangsad members
1st Jatiya Sangsad members
5th Jatiya Sangsad members
1939 births
7th Jatiya Sangsad members
Jatiya Party politicians